(The Troublemaker) is a Spanish zarzuela with a libretto by José López Silva and Carlos Fernández Shaw and music by Ruperto Chapí. It premiered on 25 November 1897 at the Apollo Theatre in Madrid.

Adaptations
It has been made into several films:
 The Troublemaker (1924 film), a silent film directed by Florián Rey 
 The Troublemaker (1950 film), a film directed by José Díaz Morales
 The Troublemaker (1963 film), a film also directed by José Díaz Morales
 The Troublemaker (1969 film), a film directed by Juan de Orduña

References

Bibliography
 Vincent J. Cincotta. Zarzuela, the Spanish Lyric Theatre: A Complete Reference. University of Wollongong Press, 2002.

Zarzuelas by Ruperto Chapí
Spanish-language operas
1897 operas
Operas
Operas adapted into films